Raghu Ramakrishnan is a researcher in the areas of database and information management.  He is a Technical Fellow at Microsoft.  He has been a Vice President and Research Fellow for Yahoo! Inc.

Ramakrishnan spent 22 years as a professor at the University of Wisconsin–Madison. With Johannes Gehrke, he authored the popular textbook Database Management Systems, also known as the "Cow Book".

Ramakrishnan received a bachelor's degree from IIT Madras in 1983, and a Ph.D. from the University of Texas at Austin in 1987.  He has been selected as an ACM Fellow (2001) and a Packard fellow, and has done pioneering research in the areas of deductive databases, data mining, exploratory data analysis, data privacy, and web-scale data integration. The focus of his work in 2007 was community-based information management.

Since 2012, Ramakrishnan has been working at Microsoft, heading Cloud and Information Services Lab (CISL) and leading the development of Azure Data Lake.

Bibliography 
 Ramakrishnan, R. (1998). Database management systems. Boston, MA: WCB/McGraw-Hill.
 Ramakrishnan, R., & Gehrke, J. (2000). Database management systems (2nd ed.). Boston, MA: McGraw-Hill.
 Ramakrishnan, R., & Gehrke, J. (2003). Database management systems (3rd ed.). Boston, MA: McGraw-Hill.

References

External links
Raghu's Wisconsin homepage
Raghu's Yahoo! homepage
Database Management Systems Book

Fellows of the Association for Computing Machinery
Database researchers
Living people
Data miners
Yahoo! employees
Microsoft employees
Year of birth missing (living people)
IIT Madras alumni
Microsoft technical fellows